Batiana is a genus of moths of the family Crambidae. It contains only one species, Batiana remotella, which is found in Australia, where it has been recorded from New South Wales.

References

Crambinae
Crambidae genera
Taxa named by Francis Walker (entomologist)
Taxa described in 1866
Monotypic moth genera